Frederick Wellman may refer to:

Frederick Creighton Wellman (1873-1960), American entomologist and physician
Frederick Lovejoy Wellman (1897-1994), American plant pathologist, son of Frederick Creighton Wellman

See also
Wellmann